Old Town Eureka (formally the Eureka Old Town Historic District) in Eureka, California, is a historic district listed on the United States National Register of Historic Places. It is a  area containing 154 buildings mostly from the Victorian era. The core of the district runs the length of First, Second, and Third Streets, between "C" and "M" Streets, and includes many types of architecture including Eastlake, Queen Ann, Greek Revival, Classical Revival, and Second Empire styles from the 1850s to the 20th century. Though not officially within the district, the Carson Mansion commands the highest elevation at the eastern edge of the district.

History
The city began as an 1850 settlement on the edge of Humboldt Bay. Developers and settlers planned for Eureka to aid in the provision of miners working inland to the east. By 1865, the central core of what would become Eureka's "Old Town" was considered "a lively place for a small town, full of business and with plenty of money." The roads beyond Second street (the equivalent of "Main" Street) were covered with stumps from the (recently logged) Redwood forest, and had not opened yet.''  
Old Town Eureka was named as one of the 100 best art towns in America. Within its bounds is the Clarke Historical Museum.

Examples of historic architecture in Old Town

See also

 National Register of Historic Places listings in Humboldt County, California

References

External links

General guides
 Eureka Old Town
 Old Town and Downtown Eureka
 Humboldt County Convention and Visitors Bureau
 Old Town Eureka
 The "Hum Guide:" Extensive area resources and information

Arts, music & museums
 Arts Alive!
 Clarke Historical Museum
 Eureka Art and Culture Commission
 HSU First Street Gallery - Fine Arts Exhibitions owned and operated by Humboldt State University
 Humboldt Arts Council and Morris Graves Museum Website
 Redwood Art Association
 Redwood Curtain Theatre

California Historical Landmarks
Buildings and structures in Eureka, California
History of Humboldt County, California
Tourist attractions in Eureka, California
Historic districts on the National Register of Historic Places in California
National Register of Historic Places in Humboldt County, California
Western false front architecture